The 1987 Individual Long Track World Championship was the 17th edition of the FIM speedway Individual Long Track World Championship. The event was held on 20 September 1987 in Mühldorf, Germany, which was West Germany at the time.

The world title was won by Karl Maier of West Germany for the third time.

Final Classification 

 E = eliminated (no further ride)
 f = fell
 ef = engine failure
 x = excluded

References 

1987
Speedway competitions in Germany
Sport in West Germany
Sports competitions in West Germany
Motor
Motor